The Cherăstău is a left tributary of the river Timișana in Romania. It discharges into the Timișana near Sinersig.

References

Rivers of Romania
Rivers of Timiș County